Vevey is a town in the canton of Vaud, Switzerland, on the shores of Lake Geneva.

Vevey may also refer to:
 Vevey District former district of Vaud based on the town, merged in 2006 into Riviera-Pays-d'Enhaut district
 FC Vevey United, football club in the town
 Vevey railway station, in the town
 Vevey (The Warlocks album), 2017 album recorded live in the town in 2016

See also
 Vevay (disambiguation)
 Veve (disambiguation)
 Veveyse District, canton of Fribourg, Switzerland